Frank Elmer Smith (August 22, 1864 – March 4, 1943) was an American sailor serving in the United States Navy during the Boxer Rebellion who received the Medal of Honor for bravery.

Biography
Smith was born August 22, 1864, in Boston, Massachusetts, and after entering the navy he was sent as an Oiler to China to fight in the Boxer Rebellion. Smith died on March 4, 1943.

Medal of Honor citation
Rank and organization: Oiler, U.S. Navy. Born: 22 August 1864, Boston, Mass. Accredited to: Virginia. G.O. No.: 55, 19 July 1901.

Citation:

In action with the relief expedition of the Allied Forces in China during the battles of 13, 20, 21, and 22 June 1900. Throughout this period and in the presence of the enemy, Smith distinguished himself by meritorious conduct.

See also

List of Medal of Honor recipients
List of Medal of Honor recipients for the Boxer Rebellion

References

External links

1864 births
1943 deaths
United States Navy Medal of Honor recipients
United States Navy sailors
American military personnel of the Boxer Rebellion
People from Boston
Boxer Rebellion recipients of the Medal of Honor